Duchess Margaret of Schleswig-Holstein-Sonderburg (24 February 1583 – 10/20 April 1658), official titles: Erbin zu Norwegen, Herzogin zu Schleswig, Holstein, Stormarn und der Dithmarschen, Gräfin zu Oldenburg und Delmenhorst), was a duchess from the House of Schleswig-Holstein-Sonderburg and through marriage Countess of Nassau-Siegen.

Biography 

Margaret was born at Haus Sandberg am Alsensund near Sonderburg on 24 February 1583 as the youngest daughter of Duke John ‘the Younger’ of Schleswig-Holstein-Sonderburg and his first wife Duchess Elisabeth of Brunswick-Grubenhagen. Margaret’s father was a younger brother of King Frederick II of Denmark.

Margaret married at Rotenburg Castle on 27 August 1603 to Count John VII ‘the Middle’ of Nassau-Siegen (7 June 1561 – Siegen Castle, 27 September 1623), the second son of Count John VI ‘the Elder’ of Nassau-Siegen and his first wife Landgravine Elisabeth of Leuchtenberg. John ‘the Middle’ was the widower of Countess Magdalene of Waldeck-Wildungen (1558 – Idstein Castle, 9 September 1599).

Margaret met John after he had served as commander-in-chief of the Swedish army in Livonia. Although he already had a son a year older than Margaret, they married.

When his father died on 8 October 1606, John succeeded his father together with his brothers William Louis, George, Ernest Casimir and John Louis. On 30 March 1607 the brothers divided their possessions. John acquired Siegen, Freudenberg, Netphen, Hilchenbach,  and the Haingericht. Since the partition, John has had his Residenz in Siegen Castle, which he had renovated around that time.

John’s idea to give the Protestant cause good leaders for a people’s army, was the reason for the Kriegsschule, founded in Siegen in 1616, probably the world’s first military academy. The princes John asked for financial support, did not give him a penny. But despite the fact that he was so indebted by supporting the Dutch Revolt, that for some time he considered giving up his residence in Siegen and going to live with his brother William Louis, he nevertheless founded the school. At that time Margaret wrote a letter to King Christian IV of Denmark, asking for the payment of an old debt. Possibly Danish money served to open the Kriegsschule. However, the Thirty Years’ War broke out so early that the Kriegsschule in Siegen could not be effective and soon ceased to exist.

When John received the County of Nassau-Siegen in 1607, he decided that such a small country (it had about 9,000 inhabitants and yielded an annual revenue of about 13,000 guilders) should not be divided up again. In order to avoid this, he made a will and testament, which stated that only the eldest son would rule and the other children should be compensated with money or offices. As one of the most convinced advocates of Protestantism, it was particularly painful for John that his second son, John ‘the Younger’, converted to the Catholic Church in 1613. In a codicil of 8 October 1613 John ‘the Middle’ explicitly stipulated that his heirs had to keep the land in the Reformed confession. At first, the conversion of John ‘the Younger’ to Catholicism did not change this house law established by the will, because he was not the eldest son. That was John John Ernest.

To the great surprise of his relatives, John ‘the Younger’ joined the Spaniards in 1617 and thus joined the opponents of the House of Nassau and the Dutch Republic. In the same year, his older brother John Ernest died in the service of the Republic of Venice. The transition of John ‘the Younger’ to the political enemy hit his father as hard as the conversion to Catholicism had hit him. This new situation forced John ‘the Middle’ to ask himself whether an enemy of Nassau and the Netherlands could remain his heir at all. On 15 November 1617, John ‘the Middle’ declared his will of 8 April 1607 to be null and void. Abolition of the primogeniture would have meant a division of the small country, and therefore John ‘the Middle’ opposed all proposals in that direction. Instead, in an amicable agreement, he had his son sign a declaration on 31 December 1617, in which the latter declared that, although he himself was and remained a Catholic, he would not force his subjects to any other than the existing religious confession. All his brothers advised John ‘the Middle’ to change the primogeniture, but he firmly trusted the word, the letter and the seal of his son. On 22 December 1618 John ‘the Middle’ drew up a second will, which had the above-mentioned promises of his son as a condition and still held on to the primogeniture. However, he imposed the penalty of disinheritance on the introduction of ‘papism’.

Only once John ‘the Middle’ was convinced that his son was under the influence of the Jesuits and that the possibility of a Catholic area within the Nassau lands was a danger to the Protestant inhabitants, did he get persuaded to make a new will. On 3 July 1621 he drew up a third will, in which he laid down something that he had always considered to be utterly nonsensical, namely to divide the small county of Nassau-Siegen, which was barely able to support one lord, into three parts. His three eldest sons, John ‘the Younger’, William (both sons of John’s first marriage) and John Maurice (the eldest son of Margaret), were to receive one third each. The administration of the city of Siegen would remain in joint ownership of the three sons.

For John ‘the Younger’, therefore, only one third of the county was provided for in the third will. On 6 August 1621, he was informed of this, with a precise statement of the reasons that had led his father to take this step. On 9 May 1623, i.e. not until two years later, John ‘the Younger’ protested against this with a letter from Frankfurt to the councillors of Siegen. Of course, in the meantime he had not been idle and had not hesitated to denounce his father to the Emperor. At the time of his letter of protest he was certainly already aware of the Poenale mandatum cassatorium, which Emperor Ferdinand II officially issued some time later, on 27 June 1623, informing John ‘the Middle’ that at the time of making his third will as a fellow combatant of the outlawed ‘Winter King’ he was not entitled to make a will. He had to revoke it and answer to an imperial court within two months. It seems that John ‘the Younger’ then shrank from having the imperial decree delivered to his seriously ill father.

John died a shortly afterwards, aged 62. None of the three sons mentioned in the will were present at the death of their father. On 13 October William and John Maurice arrived in Siegen, and on 26 October John ‘the Younger’. There he had planned a dignified burial vault for the dynasty he founded, in the St. Nicholas Church in Siegen. For this, there are remarkable notes in Latin, partly in elegiac couplets, for a projected memorial and burial place of the sovereign family, from the time around 1620, with the names of all 25 children from his two marriages, also with details of birth, marriage and death of his relatives. Since the project was not carried out, the burials of the members of the sovereign family between 1607 and 1658 took place in the inadequate burial vault under the choir of the mentioned parish church.

Everyone knew that there would be a dispute at the reading of the will on 11 December 1623. John ‘the Younger’ had the imperial decree read out, and when his brothers were not very impressed by it, he said as he stood up: ‘Der Kaiser wird uns scheiden!’ (‘The Emperor will part us!’). He had taken the precaution of obtaining a further imperial decree on 20 November 1623 against Margaret (now the Countess Dowager) and her sons, in which the Emperor strictly forbade impeding John’s assumption of government, his taking possession of the land and his inauguration. On 12 January 1624, John ‘the Younger’ was able to accept the homage from the city of Siegen, but only because he beforehand had secretly let a squadron of selected horsemen into the town through the castle gate (that is, not through a city gate) in a heavy snowstorm, so that they could not be seen or heard by the town guards.

John ‘the Younger’ thus received the entire inheritance, and the provisions of the will made in favour of William and John Maurice remained a dead letter. With the exception of John Maurice and George Frederick, the younger brothers accepted only modest appanages. Henceforth, until 1645, the county of Nassau-Siegen had two governments, one in Siegen, the other in Hilchenbach. However, for a short period (1632–1635) this situation underwent a temporary change: during the Thirty Years’ War, his brothers, who were fighting on the Protestant side, rebelled against John ‘the Younger’.

Count Louis Henry of Nassau-Dillenburg entered the service of King Gustavus II Adolphus of Sweden on 1 December 1631, who had landed in Germany on 24 June 1630 to intervene in favour of the Protestants in the Thirty Years’ War. Countess Dowager Margaret, through the mediation of Louis Henry, turned to Gustavus Adolphus and asked for help against the machinations of her stepson John ‘the Younger’. Consequently, on 14 February 1632 the Swedish king sent an order from Frankfurt to Louis Henry to provide military support for his first cousin John Maurice. Louis Henry then occupied the city of Siegen with his regiment of Dutch and Swedish soldiers. One day later, on 29 February, John Maurice and his brother Henry arrived in Siegen. Just as John ‘the Younger’ had kept his cavalry in reserve eight years earlier, now John Maurice and Henry, supported by the presence of the Swedish regiment, negotiated with the citizens, who felt bound by the oath they had sworn to John ‘the Younger’. On 4 March, after long and difficult negotiations, the citizens paid homage to John Maurice and Henry. John Maurice obtained for himself not only the Freudenberg district, which his father had intended for him in the will of 1621, but also Netphen, which had been intended for John ‘the Younger’ in the same will. William was not only confirmed in the possession of Hilchenbach, but also received Ferndorf and Krombach, as stipulated in his father’s will. The city of Siegen paid homage only to William and John Maurice, who only in 1635 admitted their elder brother John ‘the Younger’ back into co-sovereignty. However, the latter soon restored the old order: in 1636, he again became the sole owner of his father’s property, with the exception of Hilchenbach, which he left to William, and he again governed the city of Siegen alone. John Maurice was again excluded from the county’s sovereignty. However, in 1642 he inherited the territory from his brother William in accordance with his father’s will.

John ‘the Younger’ died in Ronse on 27 July 1638. His only son John Francis Desideratus was born in Nozeroy on 28 July 1627. His mother acted as regent until his marriage in 1651. He made several attempts to obtain the whole Siegerland. In 1646 he visited the Emperor in Vienna to protest against his uncle John Maurice’s seizure of the county. On 22 January 1645, after his return from Brazil, the latter, with his brothers George Frederick and Henry and an 80-man entourage, had forcibly occupied Siegen Castle and on 15 February had received the renewed homage from the citizens, albeit this time only for two thirds of the county. In order to end the constant dispute, John Maurice wanted to adhere strictly to his father’s will of 1621 and leave his nephew John Francis Desideratus the one third that was due to him. Already before his departure to Brazil, on 25 October 1635, he had explicitly authorised his subjects to recognise the then still living John ‘the Younger’ as co-ruler. In 1645 John Maurice relinquished his rights to the Freudenberg district, granted by the will of 1621, in favour of his brother George Frederick. John Francis Desideratus was unsuccessful with the Emperor in Vienna, and two years later, at the Congress of Westphalia, Emperor Ferdinand III ratified the fiercely contested 1621 will of John ‘the Middle’. This left John Francis Desideratus only the Catholic third part, which is still known today as Johannland. John Maurice held both the other thirds in his hand, because his brother William had already died and left him his third part, and George Frederick had ceded all his rights to John Maurice in 1649. It was therefore the latter who continued to administer the Freudenberg district.

Issue 
From the marriage of Margaret and John ‘the Middle’ the following children were born:
 Fürst John Maurice (Dillenburg Castle, 18 June 1604 – Berg und Tal near Cleves, 10/20 December 1679), was among others captain-admiral-governor-general of Dutch Brazil 1636–1644, stadtholder of Cleves, Mark, Ravensberg and Minden since 1647, Grand Master of the Order of Saint John since 1652 and First Field Marshal of the Dutch States Army 1668–1674. Became count in ⅔ part of the County of Nassau-Siegen in 1645 and was elevated to Reichsfürst in 1652.
 George Frederick Louis (Dillenburg Castle, 23 February 1606 – Bergen op Zoom, 2 October 1674), was among others commander of Rheinberg and governor of Bergen op Zoom. In 1664 he was elevated to the rank and title of prince. Married in The Hague on 4 June 1647 to Mauritia Eleonora of Portugal (baptised Delft, 10 May 1609 – Bergen op Zoom, 15 June 1674).
 William Otto (Dillenburg Castle, 23 June 1607 – near Wolfenbüttel, 14 August 1641), was an officer in the Swedish army.
 Sophie Margaret (Siegen Castle, 16 April 1610 – , Terborg, 8/18 May 1665), married at Wisch Castle in Terborg on 13 January 1656 to George Ernest of Limburg-Stirum (Botmurde, 29 August 1593 – September 1661), Count of Bronckhorst, Lord of Wisch, Lichtenvoorde and Wildenborch.
 Henry (Siegen Castle, 9 August 1611 – Hulst, 27 October/7 November 1652), was among others colonel in the Dutch States Army, governor of Hulst and envoy on behalf of the States-General of the Netherlands. Married at Wisch Castle in Terborg on 19/29 April 1646 to Countess Mary Magdalene of Limburg-Stirum (1632 – Nassauischer Hof, Siegen, 27 December 1707).
 Mary Juliane (Siegen Castle, 14 August 1612 – Neuhaus an der Elbe, 21 January 1665Jul.), married in Treptow on 13 December 1637 to Duke Francis Henry of Saxe-Lauenburg (9 April 1604 – 26 November 1658).
 Amalie (Siegen Castle, 2 September 1613 – Sulzbach, 24 August 1669Greg.), married:
 in Alt-Stettin on 23 April 1636 to Herman Wrangel af Salmis (in Livonia, 29 June 1587 – Riga, 11 December 1643);
 in Stockholm on 27 March 1649 to Count Palatine Christian Augustus of Sulzbach (Sulzbach, 26 July 1622 – Sulzbach, 23 April 1708).
 Bernhard (Siegen Castle, 18 November 1614 – Siegen Castle, 6 January 1617Jul.).
 Christian (Siegen Castle, 16 July 1616 – near Düren, 1/11 April 1644), was a colonel in the Imperial Army. Married ca. 1641 to Anna Barbara von Quadt-Landskron-Rheinbach.
 Catharine (Siegen Castle, 1 August 1617 – Nassauischer Hof, Siegen, 31 August 1645).
 John Ernest (Siegen Castle, 8 November 1618Jul. – São Salvador da Bahia de Todos os Santos, Brazil, 23 November 1639), was a naval officer on board the ‘Alkmaar’.
 Elisabeth Juliane (Siegen Castle, 1 May 1620Jul. – Wesel, 13 May 1665), married in the Nassauischer Hof in Siegen on 9/19 August 1647 to Count Bernhard of Sayn-Wittgenstein-Berleburg-Neumagen (30 November 1620 – , 13 December 1675).

Known descendants
Margaret has several known descendants. Among them are:
 the Fürst of Liechtenstein,
 the head of the no longer reigning royal house of Austria,
 the head of the no longer reigning royal house of Bavaria,
 the French writer George Sand.

Ancestors

Notes

References

Sources 
 
 
  (1911). "George Frederik, Georg Friedrich". In:  en  (redactie), Nieuw Nederlandsch Biografisch Woordenboek (in Dutch). Vol. Eerste deel. Leiden: A.W. Sijthoff. p. 926.
  (1911). "Johan VII". In:  en  (redactie), Nieuw Nederlandsch Biografisch Woordenboek (in Dutch). Vol. Eerste deel. Leiden: A.W. Sijthoff. p. 1221.
 
 
 
 
 
 
 
 
 
 
 
 
 
 
 
 
 
 
 
  (2004). "Die Fürstengruft zu Siegen und die darin von 1669 bis 1781 erfolgten Beisetzungen". In:  u.a. (Redaktion), Siegener Beiträge. Jahrbuch für regionale Geschichte (in German). Vol. 9. Siegen: Geschichtswerkstatt Siegen – Arbeitskreis für Regionalgeschichte e.V. p. 183–202.
 
 
  (1882). Het vorstenhuis Oranje-Nassau. Van de vroegste tijden tot heden (in Dutch). Leiden: A.W. Sijthoff/Utrecht: J.L. Beijers.

External links 

 Nassau. In: Medieval Lands. A prosopography of medieval European noble and royal families, compiled by Charles Cawley.
 Nassau Part 5. In: An Online Gotha, by Paul Theroff.
 Schleswig-Holstein. In: Medieval Lands. A prosopography of medieval European noble and royal families, compiled by Charles Cawley.
 The House of Oldenburg Part 3. In: An Online Gotha, by Paul Theroff.

|-

Schleswig-Holstein-Sonderburg, Margaret
Schleswig-Holstein-Sonderburg, Margaret
House of Oldenburg in Schleswig-Holstein
Countesses of Nassau
∞
Schleswig-Holstein-Sonderburg, Margaret
Schleswig-Holstein-Sonderburg, Margaret
Schleswig-Holstein-Sonderburg, Margaret